Edward Freeman may refer to:
Edward Augustus Freeman (1823–1892), English historian
Edward Monroe Freeman (1875–1954), American botanist
Edward Freeman (cricketer, born 1848) (1848–1905), Australian cricketer
Edward Freeman (cricketer, born 1860) (1860–1939), English cricketer
Edward Freeman (cricketer, born 1880) (1880–1964), English cricketer
R. Edward Freeman (born 1951), modern American business professor, economist and ethicist
Ed Freeman (1927–2008), U.S. Army pilot and Medal of Honor recipient
Eddie Freeman (born 1978), Canadian football player
Eddie Freeman (musician) (1909–1987), English jazz musician
Ted Freeman (politician) (1900–1986), politician in Ontario, Canada